AHU Knights were an Amateur Athletic Union-sanctioned Tier II junior ice hockey team based out of Gilbert, Arizona. The Knights were a part of the Western States Hockey League and played in the Western Division.  Their home games were played at AZ Ice Gilbert in Gilbert, Arizona. The organization was operated by Arizona Hockey Club, Inc, which also runs a local youth hockey program.

History
The franchise, originally known as the Phoenix Polar Bears, joined the WSHL in 1999. In 2011, the owners of the Polar Bears dropped their WSHL membership when the league left USA Hockey sanctioning for the Amateur Athletic Union. The franchise was sold to Arizona Hockey Clubs, Inc. and was renamed as the Phoenix Knights.

Colten St. Clair was named head coach and general manager in March 2017.  St. Clair grew up in Gilbert, Arizona, before playing junior hockey for the Fargo Force of the United States Hockey League and in NCAA Division I for the University of North Dakota. After one season and being named the coach of the year for 2017–18, St. Clair left to become a volunteer assistant coach for the NCAA Division I University of Maine.

The organization then failed to find a new head coach in time to adequately recruit for the 2018–19 season and withdrew from participation.

Season-by-season records

References

Ice hockey teams in Arizona
Sports in Phoenix, Arizona